Polycera abei is a species of sea slug, a nudibranch, a marine gastropod mollusk in the family Polyceridae.

Distribution
This species of polycerid nudibranch was described from Japan.

Description
The body of Polycera abei is translucent yellowish-white. The entire back and sides are covered with moderate sized black spots and fewer, slightly larger, orange spots. The oral veil has six tapering black-tipped papillae.

References

External links
 

Polyceridae
Gastropods described in 1960